Ringstabekk is a station on the Kolsås Line (line 2) on the Oslo Metro system. Located in Bærum, Norway, it is between Bekkestua and Jar, 10.2 km west of Stortinget.

The station opened on 15 August 2011 and replaces the former station with the same name and Tjernsrud as part of the upgrade of the Kolsås Line to metro standard.

The station is located at the section of the line where it is shared with the Lilleaker Line used by the Oslo Tramway. However, due to lack of dedicated low-height platforms, trams do not stop at this station.

References

External links

Oslo Metro stations in Bærum
Railway stations opened in 2011
2011 establishments in Norway